FSV Glückauf Brieske-Senftenberg is a German football club from Senftenberg in Brandenburg, currently playing in the Landesliga Brandenburg-Süd (VII).

History 
FSV Glückauf Brieske-Senftenberg was founded on 19 January 1919 as Fußballverein Grube Marga before becoming Fußballsportverein Grube Marga in 1928. The club was renamed Sportverein Sturm Grube Marga in 1933 and played two seasons (1941–43) in the Gauliga Berlin-Brandenburg, one of the country's 16 top-flight regional divisions.

After World War II, the club was closed before being reformed as Sportgemeinde Grube Marga and becoming part of the separate football competition that emerged in East Germany under Soviet occupation. In 1948, it was renamed BSG Franz Mehring Grube in recognition of leftist politician, journalist and writer Franz Mehring. Two years later the club was known as BSG Aktivist Ost Brieske and became part of the DDR-Oberliga (I). The team then played as SC Aktivist Brieske-Senftenberg between 1954 and 1963, earning their best result in 1958 when they finished third.

They were relegated after a 14th-place result in 1963 and the club was broken up. The footballers were delegated to establish Sportclub Cottbus, whose football side became independent as BSG Energie Cottbus in 1966 and was the predecessor of FC Energie Cottbus.

The reserve team of SC Aktivist  merged with BSG Aktivist Brieske-Ost to form BSG Aktivist Senftenberg in February 1972 and went on to play in the DDR-Liga (II). After German reunification in 1990, the club was renamed FSV Glückauf Brieske-Senftenberg and became one of the founding members of the NOFV-Oberliga Mitte (III) in the combined German football competition. After the dissolution of the NOFV-Oberliga Mitte, Brieske qualified for the NOFV-Oberliga Süd in 1994. It was relegated from third-tier competition after finishing 15th in the 1995–96 season.

Since then the club has played in the Brandenburg-Liga and the Landesliga below that. It has played in the Landesliga since it was once again relegated in 2011.

Honours
The club's honours:
 Landesliga Brandenburg-Süd
 Champions: 2009
 Runners-up: 2014

References

External links 
 FSV Glückauf Brieske-Senftenberg 

Football clubs in Germany
Football clubs in Brandenburg
Football clubs in East Germany
Association football clubs established in 1919
1919 establishments in Germany
FSV Glückauf Brieske-Senftenberg